Saint-Barthélemy-d'Anjou (literally Saint-Barthélemy of Anjou) is a commune in the Maine-et-Loire department in western France. It is known as the place where Cointreau orange liqueur is produced. Cointreau was invented and previously produced in Angers, though the factory has now been moved to the industrial zone of Saint-Barthélémy d'Anjou, from where it is now exported globally.

Population

See also
Communes of the Maine-et-Loire department

References

Saintbarthelemydanjou